Veselin Matić (born July 21, 1960) also known by his nickname Toza, is a Serbian professional basketball coach. He is currently the head coach of India men's national basketball team.

Personal life 
His son, Andrija Matić, is also a basketball player who played for American University and plays now for Keiser University.

Coaching career

Work with NBA players 
Matić has had worked with multiple NBA players in his career. He worked with Boris Diaw, Vladimir Radmanović, Željko Rebrača, Peja Stojaković, Predrag Drobnjak, Marko Jarić, Marcin Gortat, Hamed Hadadi, Samaki Walker and Loren Woods.

Coaching clinics and camps 
Matić held coaching clinics in over 30 countries in the world, including countries like Serbia, Lithuania, Poland, Korea, Japan or Egypt.
Matić worked in multiple basketball camps around the world. When he was younger he worked in the Adidas Eurocamp (1996–99), but has now been part of FIBA's YUBAC, where he has been the Camp head coach since 2004. At YUBAC he has helped out in multiple Areas including Pro Camp, Shooting Camp and Basic Camp.

Work with FIBA (2012–present) 
Matić is an official FIBA scout for the FIBA Men world championships. He attended the U17 FIBA World Championship in Kaunas (2012), Lithuania, the U19 FIBA World Championship in Prague (2013), Czech Republic, the U17 FIBA World Championship in Dubai (2014), UAE, the U19 FIBA World Championship in Heraklion (2015), Grece, the U17 FIBA World Championship in Saragossa (2016), Spain and the FIBA Senior World Championship in Saragossa (2016). In 2017, he also worked on the basketball 3 level coaching manual made by FIBA.

National team highlights
  European under-16 Champion (1997)
  World Champion (1998, Scout)
  European Champion (2001, Assistant)
  World Champion (2002, Assistant)
  Asian Champion (2009)
  3x3 Asia Indoor Champion (2009)
  World Championship Participation (2010)
  Asia Games Bronze Medalist (2010)
 Iran's first Win at International Competition- vs. Tunisia (2010)
 West Asian Champion (2015)
 Qualification Pre Olympic Qualifying Tournament Tournament (2015)
 1st round World Championship Qualifiers (2017)
 2nd round World Championship Qualifiers (2018)
 Asian Games 6th Place (2018)
 South Asian Games Champion (2019)

See also 
 List of Red Star Belgrade basketball coaches

References

External links 
Veselin Matic on Instagram
Veselin Matic on Facebook

1960 births
Living people
BC Kalev/Cramo coaches
Serbian expatriate basketball people in Estonia
Serbian expatriate basketball people in Germany
Serbian expatriate basketball people in Poland
Serbian expatriate basketball people in India
Serbian expatriate basketball people in Iran
Serbian expatriate basketball people in Lebanon
Serbian expatriate basketball people in Syria
KK Crvena zvezda head coaches
KK Crvena zvezda assistant coaches
KK Crvena zvezda youth players
OKK Beograd coaches
OKK Beograd players
Serbian men's basketball coaches
Sagesse SC basketball coaches